Ammar bin Humaid Al Nuaimi (born 1969) is the Crown Prince of Ajman, one of the United Arab Emirates, and chairman of the Ajman Executive Council.

Biography
Ammar bin Humaid was born in 1969. His father, Humaid bin Rashid Al Nuaimi, is the ruler of Ajman. His mother, Amna Ahmad Ghurair, was the second wife of Humaid bin Rashid and died in 1981. He is a graduate of the Ajman Police Academy. 

Ammar bin Humaid is the owner of Ajman Stud which he established in 2002. He has been chairman of the Ajman Executive Council since 2003. He is also the chairman of Ajman Bank and chairs the Humaid bin Rashid Al Nuaimi Charitable and Humanitarian Foundation.

Ammar bin Humaid is married to Asma bint Saqr Al Qasimi, who is sister to Saud bin Saqr Al Qasimi, the ruler of Ras Al Khaimah.

References

1969 births
Crown princes
Living people
People from the Emirate of Ajman
Sons of monarchs